Shaadi is a Hindi language film starring Madhuri, Motilal and Ishwarlal. It was released in 1941.

References

External links
 

1941 films
1940s Hindi-language films
Films about Indian weddings
Indian black-and-white films
Films directed by Jayant Desai